Infanta Maria of Spain may refer to:

 Maria of Austria, Holy Roman Empress (1528–1603)
 María of Spain (1580-1583), daughter of Philip II
 Infanta Maria of Spain (1603), daughter of Philip III
 Maria Anna of Spain (1606–1646), daughter of Philip III